Paul Anthony Martin Loughran (born 7 July 1969 in Belfast) is a Northern Irish actor. He was educated at Methodist College Belfast. He is best known for portraying Butch Dingle in ITV Soap Opera Emmerdale in which his character died in a bus crash with friend Pete Collins. After that he appeared in many other TV series such as Heartbeat. During the 1980s when the real voice of Gerry Adams, the spokesman for Sinn Féin, was forbidden to be broadcast in Britain, Loughran's voice was dubbed into recordings of him that were broadcast on British airwaves. On 24 August 2016, it was announced that Loughran had been cast as Darryl Perkins, the father of Craig Tinker (Colson Smith), in Coronation Street.

Filmography
 Casualty (2017)
 Coronation Street (1992, 2016)
 Jericho (2016)
 Blue Murder (2003–2009)
 Heartbeat (2005)
 The Baby War (2005)
 Ideal (2005)
 The Royal (2003)
 I Fought the Law (2003)
 Puckoon (2002)
 Auf Wiedersehen, Pet (2002)
 The Bill (2000)
 Emmerdale (1994–2000)
 The Darling Buds of May (1992)

External links

References

Alumni of Manchester Metropolitan University
Male television actors from Northern Ireland
1969 births
Living people
Male voice actors from Northern Ireland
People educated at Methodist College Belfast
Male actors from Belfast
People from Rothwell, West Yorkshire